Martha Frederikke Johannessen (26 October 1907 – 4 September 1973) was a Norwegian politician for the Labour Party.

She was born in Borge, Østfold.

She was elected to the Norwegian Parliament from Østfold in 1958, was re-elected three times and sat until her death in 1973. She had previously been a deputy representative from 1954–1957.

Johannessen was deputy mayor of Torsnes municipality during the terms 1955–1959 and 1959–1963.

References

1907 births
1973 deaths
Labour Party (Norway) politicians
Members of the Storting
Women members of the Storting
20th-century Norwegian women politicians
20th-century Norwegian politicians
People from Fredrikstad